Over is an ancient borough, mentioned in the Domesday Book, now a part of Winsford in Cheshire West in Cheshire, England. Wharton forms the eastern part, the boundary being the River Weaver. It is said to have retained its borough status and to be the smallest borough in England.

History

Ancient origins
Over owes its origins to the ice age when melt waters from the last ice sheet left a long line of sand expanding from near Frodsham in the north to beyond Nantwich in the south. A mile or so to the east, the River Weaver cuts a deep valley through the glacial clay. As there are few real hills in central Cheshire it would have been an ideal site for early settlers, who generally avoided valleys. Prehistoric tools have occasionally been found along the route, showing that the area had been used for many thousands of years before the first mention of the name in the Domesday Book of 1086.

Saxon times
The earliest evidence of anyone living in the area is the piece of a Saxon stone cross, which was found between the World Wars when St Chad's Church was altered. The fragment is on display near the organ today. Saint Chad was the first bishop of the Midlands in the 7th Century. There are various churches dedicated to him in Cheshire and throughout the Midlands. As it is recorded that he travelled around converting the pagans, it is possible that he converted early converts in a spring in what might have been a sacred valley at the edge of the forest. The ancient churchyard of the St Chad's church still shows a circular shape, which is usually a clue to an ancient, and often Pre-Christian, foundation. No church however is mentioned in the written records before the time of the Normans.

Norman rule
The Norman Earls of Chester had a hunting lodge or summer palace at Darnhall in Over parish. There was an enclosed area where deer and wild boar were kept to be hunted by the Earl and his guests. It was there that the last Norman Earl met his death. It was rumoured that his wife, Helen, the daughter of the Prince of Wales, had poisoned him to favour the powerful aristocrat that her daughter had married. However, as this was the time of the Barons' Wars, King Henry III took control of the county and of the manor himself and even spent time at Darnhall. It was during this time that the brook there was dammed to drive three water mills and to make pools to keep fish.

The first mention of a priest is in 1307 when a Thomas de Dutton is mentioned, but it is uncertain if this was at St. Chad's or as a chaplain at Darnhall, or both. The church and responsibility for the parish was given to St. Mary's convent in Chester, who appointed the priests in charge.

King Edward I and the foundation of Vale Royal Abbey

When Henry's son Edward was old enough, he was made Earl of Chester and took great pride in the county. On becoming King Edward I he granted several town charters for markets and defended Chester in readiness for wars in Wales. He also made a vow to found an abbey in Cheshire when he was in danger of shipwreck. As he had visited Darnhall and knew its quiet, secluded setting, he chose this area as a site for Cistercian monks. This religious order chose to live in the wildest places possible, bringing their farming skills to clear forest and to bring unused land into use for farming. A group of monks arrived from Dore Abbey in Herefordshire to set up the new abbey, but they were soon allowed to move to a better site that we now know as Vale Royal Abbey.

In 1277 the king and queen arrived in the Parish of Over to lay the foundation stones of the new abbey, which was planned to be the biggest of its kind in the country. Although the Abbot became lord of the manor, the church and parish remained the property of the convent at Chester, so Over paid tithes to both the Abbey and Convent. For a period of around 50 years, between the foundation of Vale Royal and the death of Abbot Peter, the tenants and villeins of Over periodically rebelled against the abbey's overlordship, sometimes violently.

New owners
In 1545 Vale Royal Abbey and its lands were sold during the dissolution of the monasteries, with Over being purchased by Thomas Holcroft for £466.10s.1d who sold it almost at once to Edmund Pershall.

Pershall was a London merchant who saw his purchase as a long-term investment. He got regular rents and hoped the properties would increase in value. Over was sold in the middle of the 17th Century to Thomas Cholmondeley, son of Lady Mary Cholmondeley who had purchased Vale Royal Abbey.

Civil War
In 1643, Royalists escaping from Nantwich "sacked" Over. The situation during the English Civil War was very dangerous to everyone – proof of this was discovered when workmen in Nixon Drive found a little black ale mug full of silver coins, with a date range from Queen Elizabeth I to 1643. The coins were declared a treasure trove and are now at the Grosvenor Museum in Chester.

Later 17th century
A silver mace was presented by the owner of Vale Royal Abbey mansion in this time, although it is unclear exactly by whom and when. It is still in the possession of Winsford Town Council.

Daniel King, who published his history of Cheshire in 1656, described Over thus: "tis but a small thing, but I place it here because of the great prerogative that it has, for it had a mayor". He included it in the list of boroughs of Cheshire for, despite being a tiny village, its mayor was of equal rank to the mayor of Chester.

18th century
Robert Nixon, sometimes known as the 'Palatine Prophet' and who came from Over, may have lived at this time.

The Government gave permission for artificial improvements to be made to the River Weaver in 1721 to allow large barges to reach Winsford from the port of Liverpool. At first, this was the closest that barges carrying china clay from Cornwall could get to The Potteries. The clay was then taken overland by pack horses, who in turn would bring back the finished china to be sent for export through Liverpool. In 1744, the manager of the wharf, George Wood, took control of the trade between Winsford and Stoke. He made a reasonable fortune and built Oak House, which remained a farm just off Beeston Drive before the land was purchased to build the Over Estate and Oak house remained until the mid-1980s as the de Witt family residents when the land was taken by the town council for private housing and Oak House was demolished.

That trade ended in the 1780s when the Trent and Mersey Canal carried the goods through Middlewich and bypassed the town.
The canalised Weaver was, however, the inspiration for the Duke of Bridgewater's canals and later the engineer for the Weaver Navigation, Edwin Leader Williams, designed and built the Manchester Ship Canal.

19th century – the time of salt
The salt industry became firmly established in Winsford from the 1830s, bringing with it massive pollution. As the wind usually blew away from Over, it became the popular place for more wealthy people in the town to live. However, people who worked on the barges and other people working in Winsford started to develop along the old Over Lane, now the High Street. The old Borough tried to keep itself separate but had been connected by the 1860s.

In 1869 Abraham Haigh built a cotton mill at the end of what would become Well Street. He used the water supply trapped in the sand enclosed by clay on the Over Ridge to power steam engines. However, almost as soon as the building was completed most of it was destroyed, killing some of the workers who were then buried in a communal grave at St John's church where a monument records their names. A town fire engine, although ordered, had not yet been delivered by the time of the fire.

The last mayor of Over was Edmund Leigh, who held office during the Diamond Jubilee of 1897. The mayoral status of Over was by then a purely ceremonial affair, as the right of the mayor to sit in court as a magistrate had by then been removed.

Baron Delamere, the major local landowner, sold most of his considerable property in the town in 1912, resisting the giving of the mace and title to the newly formed Winsford Urban District Council (possibly because he wanted to sell them). The mace was therefore taken back to Vale Royal Abbey and Sir William Verdin gave Winsford a new silver mace to mark the coronation of George V. In 1946 Baron Delamere's son, who had settled in Kenya, returned the old mace to Winsford when he sold the remaining family land.

Sources
The historical information in this article is sourced from the booklet It's All Over: the story of a place on a Cheshire Hill by Brian Curzon, published by Winsford Town Council in 2006.

References

Further reading

External links

Brief details
Photograph of the Over war memorial

History of Cheshire
Villages in Cheshire
Winsford